VivaAerobús serves the following destinations, :

List

References

External links

Lists of airline destinations